)  may refer to the following football and sports clubs:

Germany

 FC Eintracht Altona
 Eintracht Bad Kreuznach
 FC Eintracht Bamberg
 Eintracht Baunatal
 Eintracht 01 Berlin
 Eintracht Braunschweig
 TSC Eintracht Dortmund
 Eintracht Duisburg 1848
 Eintracht Frankfurt
 Eintracht Frankfurt Basketball
 Eintracht Frankfurt Rugby
 Eintracht Mahlsdorf
 FC Eintracht Norderstedt 03
 Eintracht Nordhorn
 FC Eintracht Rheine
 FC Eintracht Schwerin
 TSV Eintracht Stadtallendorf
 SV Eintracht Trier 05
 Eintracht Wetzlar
 SpVgg Eintracht Glas-Chemie Wirges

Other countries

 S.C. Eintracht, United States
 SK Eintracht Wels, Austria